Kolossi ( []) is a village on the outskirts of Limassol, Cyprus. It lies partly in the Sovereign Base Areas of Akrotiri and Dhekelia. Its population in 2011 was 5,651.

Kolossi is known for its medieval castle.

References

 
Geography of Akrotiri and Dhekelia
Communities in Limassol District